John Yeard, D.D.  was Dean of Achonry from 1695 until his death in 1733. He was also Chaplain to Lord Lifford's Regiment of Foot.

References

1733 deaths
Deans of Achonry
17th-century Irish Anglican priests
18th-century Irish Anglican priests